Sir John Quinton (21 December 1929 – 28 April 2012) was chairman of Barclays Bank from 1987-92.

In 1987, he succeeded Timothy Bevan as chairman of Barclays Bank, until 1992, when he was succeeded by Andrew Buxton.

Quinton was the first chairman of the FA Premier League.

References

1929 births
2012 deaths
British chairpersons of corporations
Businesspeople awarded knighthoods
English bankers
Businesspeople from Norwich
Chairmen of Barclays
Knights Bachelor
20th-century English businesspeople